Love in a Bottle is a Dutch romantic comedy directed by Paula van der Oest.

Plot
Two people in different countries fall in love over videocalls during the COVID-19 pandemic.

Reception 
De Volkskrant liked the film but said the plot got quite straining at points. The film also received mixed reviews from Trouw, NRC Handelsblad and Algemeen Dagblad.

References

External links 
 

2021 films
Dutch romantic comedy films
2021 romantic comedy films
2020s English-language films